Espen Andersen (born July 12, 1961) is a Norwegian Nordic combined skier who competed from 1982 to 1987. He won the 3 x 10 km silver medal at the 1982 FIS Nordic World Ski Championships and the silver medal in 1985.

Andersen's first victories was at the 1984 Holmenkollen ski festival, the World Cup in Falun in 1983, and at the World Cup in Sapporo in 1983.
His strength was in the jumping hill. He also had three individual World Cup victories through his career. He is the brother of ski jumper Geir Andersen.

References

Holmenkollen winners since 1892 - click Vinnere for downloadable pdf file

External links
 

1961 births
Nordic combined skiers at the 1984 Winter Olympics
Holmenkollen Ski Festival winners
Living people
Norwegian male Nordic combined skiers
Olympic Nordic combined skiers of Norway
FIS Nordic World Ski Championships medalists in Nordic combined
20th-century Norwegian people